The High Commissioner of Australia to Nigeria is an officer of the Australian Department of Foreign Affairs and Trade and the head of the High Commission of the Commonwealth of Australia in Abuja, Nigeria. The position has the rank and status of an Ambassador Extraordinary and Plenipotentiary and is currently vacant, with the head of mission being Jonathan Ball as acting high commissioner and Chargé d’Affaires since July 2022. The ambassador also holds non-resident accreditation as High Commissioner to The Gambia (1985–2004, since 2008), and Gabon (1988–1989; since 2010), and as ambassador to Benin (since 2010), Cameroon (since 2002), and Niger (since 2009), and as representative to the Economic Community of West African States (ECOWAS). Non-resident accreditation was also previously held for Ghana, Côte d'Ivoire, Senegal, and Sierra Leone from 1985 to 2004, Chad (2007–2010), and the Republic of the Congo (2009–2015). The high commissioner also has responsibility for the honorary consulates of Australia in Lagos (since 2012) and Yaoundé (since 2014).

Posting history
Immediately prior to the independence of Nigeria on 1 October 1960, Australia established a diplomatic mission in Lagos on 10 September 1960, with Lionel Phillips as Acting Commissioner, and then Acting High Commissioner from 1 October. On 8 November 1960, Robert Furlonger was appointed as the first Australian High Commissioner to the Federation of Nigeria, who took up his appointment from 1 February 1961.

High commissioners

Notes
 Also non-resident High Commissioner to Ghana, 1985–2004.
 Also non-resident Ambassador to Côte d'Ivoire, 1985–2004.
 Also non-resident Ambassador to Senegal, 1985–2004.
 Also non-resident High Commissioner to Sierra Leone, 1985–2004.
 Also non-resident High Commissioner to The Gambia, 1985–2004, 2008–present.
 Also non-resident Ambassador (1988–1989, 2010–2022) and High Commissioner (2022–present) to Gabon.
 Also non-resident Ambassador to Cameroon, 2002–present.
 Also non-resident Ambassador to Chad, 2007–2010.
 Also non-resident Ambassador to Niger, 2009–present.
 Also non-resident Ambassador to the Republic of the Congo, 2009–2015.
 Also non-resident Ambassador to Benin, 2010–present.

References

External links

Australian High Commission, Nigeria

 
 
 
 
 
 
Nigeria
Australia
Australia and the Commonwealth of Nations
Nigeria and the Commonwealth of Nations